Paul G. Tremblay (born June 30, 1971) is an American author and editor of horror, dark fantasy, and science fiction.  He is also a juror for the Shirley Jackson Awards.

Biography 
Tremblay was born in Aurora, Colorado, and raised in Massachusetts. He had spinal fusion surgery to treat scoliosis before he went to college. He attended Providence College in Providence, Rhode Island, receiving his bachelor's degree in 1993. He obtained his master's degree in mathematics from the University of Vermont in 1995.

In summers between college, Tremblay worked at the Parker Brothers factory in Salem, Massachusetts, primarily in the warehouse and assembly lines. After graduation, he began teaching high school mathematics and coaching junior varsity basketball at Saint Sebastian's School, a private school outside Boston, Massachusetts.

Tremblay's novel A Head Full of Ghosts was published on June 2, 2015 by William Morrow and won the Horror Writers Association's 2015 Bram Stoker Award for Novel. In 2015, Focus Features optioned the novel. 

Disappearance at Devil's Rock was published in 2016 and received the 2017 British Fantasy Award for best horror novel.

The Cabin at the End of the World was published June 26, 2018. It won the 2019 Bram Stoker Award for Novel and the Locus Award for Best Horror Novel. FilmNation acquired the rights to The Cabin at the End of the World in April 2018, before its publication. The novel was adapted into the 2023 film Knock at the Cabin.

Survivor Song was published on July 7, 2020 and The Pallbearers Club was published in 2022.

Bibliography 
 The Little Sleep (Henry Holt and Company, March 2009)
 The Harlequin & the Train (Necropolitan Press, June 2009, novella-length expansion of the 2003 short story)
 No Sleep till Wonderland (Henry Holt and Company, 2010)
 Swallowing a Donkey's Eye (ChiZine Publications, 2012)
 A Head Full of Ghosts (William Morrow and Company, June 2, 2015) winner of the 2015 Bram Stoker Award for Novel
 Disappearance at Devil's Rock (William Morrow and Company, June 21, 2016)
 The Cabin at the End of the World (William Morrow and Company, June 26, 2018) – winner of the 2019 Bram Stoker Award for Novel and Locus Award for Best Horror Novel
 Survivor Song (William Morrow and Company, 2020)
 The Pallbearers Club (William Morrow and Company, 2022)

Under the pseudonym P. T. Jones

References

Inline citations

General references

External links
Paul G. Tremblay's Official Web Site
 Are You Sure You Want to Read This???: Paul G. Tremblay's LiveJournal Blog
 
 
 Paul G. Tremblay interview at Punktalk
 Paul G. Tremblay essay at Largehearted Boy

1971 births
American horror novelists
Living people
Providence College alumni
University of Vermont alumni
Writers from Boston
21st-century American novelists
American male novelists
American fantasy writers
Novelists from Colorado
American male short story writers
Weird fiction writers
21st-century American short story writers
21st-century American male writers
Novelists from Massachusetts